Rudnichnoye, also known as Shalkarkol, is a lake in Bukhar-Zhyrau District, Karaganda Region, and Bayanaul District, Pavlodar Region, Kazakhstan.

Shalkar village (formerly "Pobeda"), lies close to the lakeshore at the northern end. The lake and its surroundings are a destination for tourists.

Geography
It consists of a larger western lake and a smaller eastern one, separated by a double landspit and a peninsula, and connected by a sound. The water is brackish and hard. The highest level of the lake is in April, following the melting of the snow, and the lowest after the summer, in September.

The border between Karaganda Region and Pavlodar Region cuts across Rudnichnoye's northwestern tip.

Flora and fauna
The lake has few aquatic plants; the main fish species in its waters are perch, pike, karabalik and carp.

See also 
List of lakes of Kazakhstan

References

External links

Караганда 2020: Семизбуга - курорт Рудничное
"Тайна четырёх озёр" - Autotourist.kz (in Russian)
Kazakhstan Today — В озере Рудничное в Карагандинской области обнаружено тело пропавшего мужчины

Lakes of Kazakhstan
Endorheic lakes of Asia
Pavlodar Region
Karaganda Region
Kazakh Uplands